Vadym Novynskyi  (real name Vadim Rudolfovich Malkhasyan; born 3 June 1963) is a Ukrainian (since May 2012) businessman and politician of Armenian descent. Owner of Smart Holding Group. Protodeacon of the UOC-MP. According to Forbes Novinsky's Net Worth in March 2013 was $1.9 billion.

Biography
Novynskyi was born 3 June 1963 in Staraya Russa (then USSR, now Russia). In 1985, he graduated from the Leningrad Academy of Civil Aviation in engineering management systems.

From 1985 until 1986 he worked for various companies in Russia. Novynskyi worked in Ukraine since 1996 starting with Lukoil North West and then buying Ukrainian metallurgy companies.

On 29 May 2012 Novynskyi obtained Ukrainian citizenship "for distinguished services to the country" under the order of Ukrainian President Viktor Yanukovych. Novynskyi lives in Kyiv. He also has a residence in Saint Petersburg (Russia).

The general public better known him as a Russian oligarch, who made his major fortune in the "dashing 90-e" on privatization of many Ukrainian enterprises.

As an independent Novynskyi won the 7 July 2013 by-election in constituency 224 in Sevastopol (located in the southwestern region of the Crimean Peninsula) with 53.41% with a turnout of 23.91%. Before the election Novynskyi had stated he would join the Party of Regions if he won. He did so on 5 September 2013. After the (controversial) March 2014 annexation of Crimea by Russia Novynskyi was banned from entering the peninsula by the Russian-appointed Crimean authorities.

In the October 2014 Ukrainian parliamentary election Novynskyi was again re-elected into parliament; this time after placing 11th on the electoral list of Opposition Bloc.

Since May 2014 Novynskyi is under criminal investigation for "unlawful imprisonment or kidnapping by a conspiracy" and "abuse of power or authority" for allegedly helping President Yanukovych. On 8 December 2016 parliament deprived Novynskyi of his parliamentary immunity.

In the 2019 Ukrainian parliamentary election Novynskyi was reelected in parliament as an Opposition Bloc candidate in single-seat constituency 57 (Donetsk Oblast).

On April 23, 2020, it became known that Metropolitan Onufriy (Berezovsky), Primate of the Ukrainian Orthodox Church, ordained Novinsky as a deacon. This was not officially reported; unofficially, the date of the ordination was April 7. Novynskyi served as a deacon for the first time in public at the Kyiv Pechersk Lavra on June 7, the Feast of Pentecost. On June 21, he served with two liturgical awards - a double orarion and a kalimavkion, which, according to the current rules, deacons should be awarded five and 15 years after ordination, respectively.

During the 2022 Russian invasion of Ukraine, Novynskyi declared that he would remain in Ukraine and stated that there are no excuses for the Russian attack.

Controlled assets
With partner and fellow billionaire, Andrei Klyamko Novynskyi owns Ukraine's Smart Holding Group. In 2006 they united their Ukrainian metallurgy companies into Smart Holding Group. In 2007 they exchanged them for a stake in Metinvest. Smart Holding Group has a 23.75% stake in iron ore producer Metinvest. Smart Holding also owns large assets in the oil and gas sector, shipbuilding, development, agriculture and its controlling Unex Bank and BM Bank. Its revenues in 2011 stood at $14.2 billion.

Novynskyi also has stakes in oil and gas company Regal Petroleum and supermarket chain Amstor.

Private life
Novynskyi is married and has four children.

Awards 
 Greek Orthodox Church of Jerusalem: Golden Cross of the High Taxiarch of the Knights of the Most Holy Sepulcher (January 2019)

References

External links
The Kremlin's point man in Kyiv
Official website of Smart Holding Group

1963 births
Living people
People from Staraya Russa
Independent politicians in Ukraine
Party of Regions politicians
Opposition Bloc politicians
Seventh convocation members of the Verkhovna Rada
Eighth convocation members of the Verkhovna Rada
Ninth convocation members of the Verkhovna Rada
Russian emigrants to Ukraine
Ukrainian billionaires
Ukrainian oligarchs
Russian billionaires
Naturalized citizens of Ukraine
Ukrainian football chairmen and investors
FC Sevastopol